Dakar is a jazz album by saxophonist John Coltrane. It was released in 1963 on Prestige Records. 

Dakar is a reissue of one side of the  rpm LP  Baritones and French Horns (1958), a session led by Pepper Adams and Cecil Payne on which Coltrane was a sideman. 

Dakar was one of several 1960s Prestige reissues featuring Coltrane to take advantage of his growing stardom in the 1960s.

Track listing
 "Dakar" (Teddy Charles) — 7:09
 "Mary's Blues" (Pepper Adams) — 6:47
 "Route 4" (Charles) — 6:55
 "Velvet Scene" (Waldron) — 4:53
 "Witches Pit" (Adams) — 6:42
 "Catwalk" (Charles) — 7:11

Personnel
 John Coltrane - tenor saxophone
 Cecil Payne - baritone saxophone
 Pepper Adams - baritone saxophone
 Mal Waldron - piano
 Doug Watkins - bass
 Art Taylor - drums

References

1963 albums
John Coltrane albums
Prestige Records albums
Hard bop albums
Reissue albums